Passage to Pluto is a juvenile science fiction novel, the fourteenth in Hugh Walters' Chris Godfrey of U.N.E.X.A. series.

It was published in the UK by Faber in 1973, in the US by T.Nelson Books in 1975.

It was the last of the series to have a cover illustration by Leslie Wood.

Plot summary
Chris Godfrey is now deputy-director of UNEXA; he sends his former crew-mates to investigate unexplained perturbations in the orbit of Pluto. They discover that not only are their fuel tanks holed, but a super-dense wandering planet dubbed "Planet X" is on course to decimate the Solar System.

This was the last of Hugh Walters' 'exploration' novels as his realistic approach could not envisage travel further afield.

See also

 Nibiru cataclysm

References

External links
Passage to Pluto page

1973 British novels
1973 science fiction novels
Chris Godfrey of U.N.E.X.A. series
Faber and Faber books
Fiction set on Pluto
1973 children's books